Calvin Cowgill (January 7, 1819 – February 10, 1903) was an American lawyer and politician who served one term as a U.S. Representative from Indiana from 1879 to 1881.

Biography 
Born in Clinton County, Ohio, Cowgill attended the common schools.  He moved with his parents to Indiana in 1836.  He studied law in Winchester, Randolph County.  He moved to Wabash County, Indiana, in 1846.  He was admitted to the bar and commenced practice in Wabash.  He served as member of the Indiana House of Representatives in 1851 and again during the special session of 1865.  He served as treasurer of Wabash County 1855-1859, and provost marshal of the eleventh district of Indiana 1862-1865.

Congress 
Cowgill was elected as a Republican to the Forty-sixth Congress (March 4, 1879 – March 3, 1881).  He was not a candidate for renomination in 1880 to the Forty-seventh Congress.

Later career and death 
He resumed the practice of his profession in Wabash, Indiana, where he died February 10, 1903.  He was interred in Falls Cemetery.

References

1819 births
1903 deaths
People from Clinton County, Ohio
Republican Party members of the Indiana House of Representatives
Indiana lawyers
People from Wabash, Indiana
People from Winchester, Indiana
19th-century American politicians
Republican Party members of the United States House of Representatives from Indiana